Jose Rodela (born June 15, 1937) is a United States Army veteran of the Vietnam War and a recipient of the Medal of Honor.

Military career
Rodela, a Mexican-American, joined the United States Army in 1955 at age 17, and retired with the rank of master sergeant in 1975.

Rodela was awarded the Medal of Honor by President Barack Obama in a March 18, 2014 ceremony in the White House. The award comes through the Defense Authorization Act which called for a review of Jewish American, African American and Hispanic American veterans from World War II, the Korean War and the Vietnam War to ensure that no prejudice was shown to those deserving the Medal of Honor.

The Medal of Honor recognized Rodela's valorous actions on September 1, 1969, while serving as the company commander in Phước Long Province, South Vietnam. Rodela commanded his company throughout 18 hours of continuous contact when his battalion was attacked and taking heavy casualties. Throughout the battle, in spite of his wounds, Rodela repeatedly exposed himself to enemy fire to attend to the fallen and eliminate an enemy rocket position.

Medal of Honor citation

For conspicuous gallantry and intrepidity at the risk of his life above and beyond the call of duty:

Other awards

In addition to the Medal of Honor, Rodela received the following awards:

 Bronze Star Medal
 Purple Heart with one Bronze Oak Leaf Cluster
 Air Medal with "V" Device
 Army Commendation Medal with one Bronze Oak Leaf Cluster
 Presidential Unit Citation
 Meritorious Unit Commendation with one Bronze Oak Leaf Cluster
 Army Good Conduct Medal with Silver Clasp and two Loops
 National Defense Service Medal
 Vietnam Service Medal with four Bronze Service Stars
 Republic of Vietnam Gallantry Cross with Palm Device
 Republic of Vietnam Civil Actions Medal Unit Citation
 Republic of Vietnam Campaign Medal
 Combat Infantryman Badge
 Master Parachutist Badge
 Expert Marksmanship Badge with Rifle Bar
 Special Forces Tab
 Republic of Vietnam Special Forces Honorary Jump Wings
 Colombian Army Parachutist Badge
 Army Special Forces CSIB and DUI
 5 Overseas Service Bars
 7 Service stripes

See also

List of Medal of Honor recipients for the Vietnam War
List of Hispanic Medal of Honor recipients

References

1937 births
United States Army personnel of the Vietnam War
Living people
Recipients of the Air Medal
United States Army Medal of Honor recipients
United States Army soldiers
Vietnam War recipients of the Medal of Honor